Wenzhou (pronounced ; Wenzhounese: Yuziou), historically known as Wenchow is a prefecture-level city in southeastern Zhejiang province in the People's Republic of China. Wenzhou is located at the extreme south east of Zhejiang Province with its borders connecting to Lishui on the west, Taizhou on the north, and Fujian to the south. Most of Wenzhou's area is mountainous as almost 76 percent of its  surface area is classified as mountains and hills. It is said that Wenzhou has 7/10 mountains, 1/10 water, and 2/10 farmland. At the time of the 2010 Chinese census, 3,039,500 people lived in Wenzhou's urban area; the area under its jurisdiction (which includes three satellite cities and six counties) held a population of 9,122,100 of which 31.16% are non-local residents from outside of Wenzhou.

The city, then known as Yungkia (Yǒngjiā), was a prosperous foreign treaty port, which remains well-preserved today. It is situated in a mountainous region and, as a result, has been isolated for most of its history from the rest of the country, making the local culture and language very distinct not only from the rest of China but from neighbouring areas as well. The city is also the native land of many emigrants to Europe and the United States, with many of these Wenzhounese emigrants being entrepreneurs who start restaurants, retail and wholesale businesses in their adopted countries. Wenzhou people make up a large number of ethnic Chinese residents of Italy, where in some regions such as Tuscany, they comprise 90% of all Chinese residents. Significant concentrations of Wenzhounese people can also be found across New York City as well as in France and Spain.

History

Ancient history
Wenzhou has a history which traces back to about 2500 BC, when it became known for its pottery production as one of the cities of origin of celadon in ancient China.

Wenzhou was the capital of the ancient Dong'ou Kingdom which existed from 191 BC until it was conquered by Minyue Kingdom in 138 BC.

Imperial China
In the early second century BC, shortly after the destruction of the Qin dynasty, military and political leader Zou Yao of Wenzhou helped the emperor Gaozu of Han, the first emperor of the Han Dynasty, defeat the prominent warlord Xiang Yu of the Chu. After the victory, emperor Hui of Han, the second emperor of the Han dynasty named Zhou Yao the King of Dong'ou (Wenzhou), and under the administration of Emperor Hui, Wenzhou became the capital of the Dong'ou Kingdom in the modern-day area of southern Zhejiang.

Around 760AD, the founding emperor of the Tang dynasty, Emperor Gaozu of Tang first used the current name of Wenzhou because of the city's mild weather.

The city walls were built in the tenth century, and the seven gates were erected in 1598.

Modern era
Throughout its history, Wenzhou's traditional economic role has been as a port giving access to the mountainous interior of southern Zhejiang Province. In early European sources, the name Wenzhou-Fu or -Foo was often transcribed Ouen-tcheou-fou or Wen-tcheou after the accounts of French-speaking missionaries. In 1876, Wenzhou was opened for tea exports, but no foreign settlement was ever established there. Between 1937 and 1942, during the Second Sino-Japanese War (i.e., World War II), Wenzhou achieved importance as one of the few ports still under Chinese control. It declined in the later years of the war, but began to recover after coastal trade along the Zhejiang coast was re-established in 1955.

Fengshui of Wenzhou
Wenzhou is the only city in China designed by Guo Pu, the father of the Fengshui philosophical system. During the Jin Dynasty, Guo Pu organised Wenzhou on the basis of the Fengshui philosophical system along with the Twenty-Eight Mansions, and the Five Elements. These philosophies develop and manage architecture and geography as a whole in metaphoric terms of "invisible forces" that unite the universe, earth, and humanity together.

Throughout its history, Wenzhou has avoided numerous militant activities that were originally set out to invade the city of Wenzhou. However, none of them were successful, and this protection is concluded to be the result of the Fengshui development of the city.. During the Northern Song Dynasty, when the Fangla Revolution took place in the now Zhejiang province, the invading army surrounded Wenzhou for over 40 days, but the mountainous isolation blocked the army's movement and the army ended up retreating.

Wenzhou is still considered to possess the best Feng Shui conditions and nature of all the Chinese cities. Other cities considered to possess excellent Fengshui nature are Beijing, Ili Kazakh Autonomous Prefecture, Kunming, Hengyang, and Shenzhen. However, none of these cities is designed entirely on the basis of philosophy of Fengshui or designed by the father of Fengshui, Guo Pu. People from all over China usually refer to the accomplishments and influence of Wenzhounese as a result of Wenzhou's Fengshui development by Guo Pu.

Guo Pu
When Guo Pu climbed to the top of West Guo Mountain in Wenzhou, he saw the range of mountains of Wenzhou shaped as a dipper and the city itself shaped as a key. Wenzhou is still nicknamed the "Dipper city" based on the popular geographical saying "mountains as dipper, city as key". Legend has it that during the time when Wenzhou was being established and developed, a white deer was seen in the city with a flower in its mouth, therefore Wenzhou is also known as "Deer City". Today, the Lucheng District is the name of downtown Wenzhou and the White Deer theater located at downtown is the most popular theater among the locals .

Guo Pu is honoured today by the renaming of West Guo Mountain, where he stood to observe the city, into Guo Gong Mountain. At the bottom of Guo Gong Mountain, a temple was also built and named Guo Gong Temple. In 2003, the local government constructed a statue of Guo Pu in downtown Wenzhou.

Geography

The population of the prefectural level city is 9.12 million including 2.30 million urban residents, divided among 3 county-level cities and 4 districts.

Another dominating landscape element is the Ou River, the largest river in Wenzhou prefecture. There are some coastal plains, notably around the mouth of the Ou (where the city proper of Wenzhou is located), the Nanxi River, a tributary of the Ou, and further south, around the mouth of the Feiyun River (in Rui'an, a county-level city). Coastal plains are used intensively for agriculture but also host much of the population and industry.

Dongtou, one of the districts in Wenzhou, has also been called the "County of One Hundred Islands." Dongtou County was renamed as Dongtou District in September 2015 following the State Council-sanctioned administrative region adjustments.

Wenzhou boasts wonderful landscapes with rugged mountains and tranquil waters, including three state-level scenic spots, namely the Yandang Mountains, the Nanxi River and the Baizhangji Fall-Feiyun Lake, and two national nature reserves, the Wuyanling Ridge and the Nanji Islands. Yandang Mountain has been named as a World Geopark, while the Nanji Islands are listed a UNESCO Marine Nature Reserve of World Biosphere Reserves. Scenic areas account for 25% of the city's land space.

Climate

Wenzhou derives its present name from its climate, and has a humid subtropical climate (Köppen: Cfa) with short winters and long, hot, humid summers. Summers are similar to the remainder of the province (albeit slightly cooler during the daytime as compared to inland areas), but winter is much milder, partly due to the southerly location and partly due to the sheltering effect of the surrounding mountains. Heavy rainfalls occur in late spring and early summer due to the plum rains of the East Asian monsoon, while typhoons are commonly a threat in the second half of summer causing considerable damage and destruction. With monthly percent possible sunshine ranging from 26% in March to 53% in August, the city receives 1,706 hours of bright sunshine annually.

Administration

The prefecture-level city of Wenzhou currently administers four districts, three county-level cities and five counties. Its population at 2010 census:

Economy

Wenzhou exports food, tea, wine, jute, timber, paper, Alunite (a non-metallic mineral used to make alum and fertilizer). Alunite is abundant and Wenzhou claims to be the "Alunite Capital of the World". Its 10 main industries each exceeding 1.5 billion dollars are electrical machinery, leather products, general equipment, power supply, plastic manufacturing, textile and garment, transport equipment, chemical products, metal products and metal processing.

From the 1990s, low-voltage electric appliances manufacturing became one of the major industries in Wenzhou, with some of the large private enterprises setting up joint ventures with GE and Schneider.

Companies such as Texaco, Chevron, Shell and JAPEX have started to drill for oil but the operations have been largely unsuccessful.

Wenzhou is a city full of vibrant business activities. When China began economic reforms in 1978, Wenzhou was the first city in China to set up individual and private enterprises as well as shareholder cooperatives. It has also taken the lead in carrying out financial system reform and structural reform in townships. Being a pioneer in utilizing marketing mechanism to develop urban constructions, Wenzhou has won a number of firsts in China and set many national records.

From 1978 through 2016, the GDP of Wenzhou, a third-tier city in China, has increased from 1.32 billion RMB to 504.54 billion RMB with the gross fiscal revenue increasing from 0.135 billion RMB to 72.4 billion RMB, and the disposable net per capita income for rural residents increasing from 113.5 RMB to 22,985 RMB. The per capita disposable income for urban residents increased from 422.6 RMB in 1981 to 47,785 RMB in 2016, which is the among the highest in China.

Financial Reform Pilot Project
In late March 2012, China's State Council announced that Wenzhou would be the site of a pilot project for the reform of private investment rules.  The city had been a significant source of illegal loans, and this project would legalize and provide a regulatory framework for such activities.  It has been seen not only as an attempt to legitimize Wenzhou's private finance market, but also as a model for cleaning up underground lending in China as a whole.

Birthplace of China's private economy
In the early days of economic reforms, local Wenzhounese took the lead in China in developing a commodity economy, household industries and specialized markets. Many thousands of people and families were engaged in household manufacturing to develop individual and private economy (private enterprise). Until now, Wenzhou has a total of 240,000 individually owned commercial and industrial units and 130,000 private enterprises of which 180 are group companies, four among China's top 500 enterprises and 36 among national 500 top private enterprises.  There are 27 national production bases such as "China's Shoes Capital" and "China's Capital of Electrical Equipment", China's 40 famous trademarks and China's famous-brand products and 67 national inspection-exempt products in the city. The development of private economy in Wenzhou has created the "Wenzhou Economic Model", which inspires the modernization drive in China.

The city of Wenzhou is a world leader in lighter manufacturing with over 500 such companies in the city. The plastic weaving cluster in Wenzhou comprised 1600 enterprises in 2001, employing 42,000 people with an annual output value of 20 billion Yuan. The Local cluster comprised 400 manufacturers in 2001 with a total output of 5 billion Yuan, representing 65 percent of the domestic market share. The cluster is the first in China in terms of market share and sold it products to 60 countries.

There are many areas in which people of Wenzhou opened the first example of private economy in post-1949 China. For instance, Juneyao Airlines started in July 1991, which is the first private airline company in China. Jinwen Rail Way is also the first rail way company which is built with private capital.

Industrial zones
Wenzhou Economic & Technological Development Zone
Wenzhou Economic & Technological Development Zone was established and approved by State Council in 1992. The main traffic system around the zone include No.104 National Highway, Ningbo-Wenzhou Expressway and Wenzhou Bridge. It is located near to Wenzhou International Airport and Wenzhou Port. Industries encouraged in the zone include electrical equipment, electronic information, chemical medicine, building materials, and textiles.

Wenzhou Oujiang River Estuary Industrial Zone
Located in the east of the city proper, it has an overall planned area of 3.3 million [??] square kilometers, with industrial focuses mainly on logistics, cultural and tourism industry, smart manufacturing, information technology, as well as electronics and petrochemical industry near the coastal area of Dongtou. The traffic system around the zone include the Oujiang Beikou Bridge.

Oufei Project
In 2014, the Oufei Project was initiated as a land reclamation project in Wenzhou. The original targeted area upon completion was  mu, with an estimated construction cost of 60 billion RMB. The aim of the project is stated to promote economic development, and it would serve as the largest land reclamation project in China as of 2020. In 2015 the project secured an 4.5 billion RMB in a low-interest long-term loans, receiving provincial-level support. The tideland reclamation was accomplished using a vacuum preloading method, with a planned size of 323.4 square kilometers. There was some academic criticism of the project's potential damage to waterbird coastal habitats.

Transport

Air
The Wenzhou Longwan International Airport serves the Wenzhou area, with scheduled flights to major cities in mainland China as well as Hong Kong and Macau. New direct air routes to Taipei and Cheju Island of South Korea were introduced in 2012. It's been graded as Category B civil airport, serving a population of 20 million spanning areas of Wenzhou, Taizhou and Lishui of Zhejiang and Ningde of the neighbouring Fujian. The correlated GDP of the area reaches 300 billion RMB.

The Airport started opening up in 1995 and direct flight to Macau was approved. Air route to Hong Kong was open in 1996. Linking 65 cities in the country with 34 permanently operating air routes, the Airport is among the fastest-growing and profitable among its peers in China.

The Airport ranks first in terms of passenger transit among cities of same level in China. In 2004, the Airport handled 29,700 landings, a passenger transit of 2.439 million, cargo throughput of 38,500 tons.

The new Terminal 2 was launched on 1 June 2018, which handle all domestic flights. The Terminal 1 was changed to international terminal that handles all international and regional (specifically from Wenzhou to Hong Kong, Macau and Taiwan) flights. The Terminal 2 is equipped with 21 boarding bridges, 22 security check passages, 52 check-in counters (four check-in zones, A, B, C, and D) and 6 luggage claim systems. The launch of Terminal 2 is a huge milestone in the history of Wenzhou air traffic development.

Railway

Because of Wenzhou's geographic location, it is difficult to build a railway to connect it with other cities. Wenzhou's first railway, the Jinhua–Wenzhou railway, opened on 11 June 1998. The railway runs from Wenzhou railway station northwest to Jinhua and is operated by the Jinwen Railway Company. The Jinwen Railway was the first in China to be built with local capital, and gave birth to China's first standardized joint-stock enterprise: Zhejiang Jinwen Railway Development Co., Ltd.

In September 2009, two high-speed railways opened in Wenzhou. The Ningbo–Taizhou–Wenzhou railway runs north to Hangzhou, and the Wenzhou–Fuzhou railway, runs south to Xiamen. The Jinhua–Wenzhou high-speed railway was opened on 26 December 2015.

Lucheng District in Wenzhou was the site of China's only major high-speed rail accident to date.

Rapid transit

Wenzhou Mass Transit Railway Investment Group was launched in February 2011 with registered capital of 2 billion RMB, sole purpose being in the design, investment, construction and operation of the Wenzhou Mass Transit Rail Corporation, which will consist of regional (S-series lines) and local rapid transit lines in Wenzhou. The S-Lines serve regional transportation among Wenzhou's Counties and Districts. The first line, Line S1 stretching 53.5 kilometers, opened on 23 January 2019. Construction of Line S2 started on 30 December 2015.

Yongjia School of Thought
Yongjia School of Thought is considered as one of the most distinctive schools of thought in the history of China and was one of the three most influential schools of thought in the Song Dynasty. It has a prestigious status in the world of Chinese philosophy. For centuries, it has been the cultural gene of native people in Wenzhou and has exerted influence on China for centuries since its origin in the Song Dynasty.

Main characteristics
There are four main characteristics and aspects of the Yongjia School of Thought. 
Firstly, it emphasizes the significance of "practice" over pure "theory." Secondly, it proposes that "chivalry" should not be divorced from "welfare." Thirdly, it promotes the conglomeration of agriculture and commerce. Last but not least, it underscores the significance of powerful military and economic prosperity.

Market economy and Capitalism
Yongjia School of Thought is arguably the only prestigious Chinese school of thought of which the main teachings emphasize currency, commerce, and private economy. Modern scholars attribute the unprecedented economic prosperity in the Song Dynasty to the influence of Yongjia School of Thought.

Chinese opera

During the Northern Song Dynasty in the 12th century, Nan Opera, also called as the Wenzhou Opera and Yongjia Opera, was produced in Wenzhou as the earliest form of traditional Chinese Opera in the history of China. In its early stage of development, Nan Opera developed and matured rapidly along with the prosperous economic activities that were taking place in Wenzhou influenced by Yongjia School of Thought. Wenzhou as a prosperous treaty port back in Southern Song Dynasty expanded the influence of Nan Opera greatly. Since then, Nan Opera gained its great influence in China and reached its peak in Yuan Dynasty and remained its prominent status in Ming Dynasty.

In the time period of late Yuan Dynasty, the original rulers of the country significantly lost their political power and that gave Nan Opera of Wenzhou a period of time in which it faced almost no resistance in development. Therefore, in late Yuan Dynasty, Nan Opera of Wenzhou reached its highest peak historically and later in Ming Dynasty, its original Wenzhou tone of Opera sung in Wenzhounese lost its influence and was mostly replaced by Kun Shan tone of Opera. Later on, because of the replacement in tone, Nan Opera gradually transcended into its later form chuanqi, and remained its influence and became one of the major forms of drama in Ming Dynasty.

Role distribution system
On the stage setting of a Nan Opera performance, there are generally seven role distribution elements, Life, Denier, Ugliness, Clarity, Finale (Exterior, Attachment, with the main drama plot developed around Life and Denial complemented usually by Ugliness, Clarity, and Finale. This stage setting system of Nan Opera invented in Wenzhou with seven-element role distribution principle is the earliest complete on-stage role distribution principle system in the history of Chinese Opera.

Four Miracles of Yuan Dynasty
Although Nan opera is the first mature form of traditional Chinese opera, throughout its history of development unlike that of many other later forms of Chinese opera, Nan opera was generally disregarded and repelled by the officials in early Yuan Dynasty who held great contempt for the Southern Chinese people.

Despite the great resistance, local Wenzhounese that kept on developing Nan Drama still managed to compose extraordinary works respectively named as the "Jing Cha Tale", "Bai Tu Tale", "Bai Yue Ting", and "Sha Gou Ji", which were later known as the "Four Miracles" of Yuan Dynasty. According to modern studies, at least half of the Four Miracles were entirely created by local Wenzhounese artists with no non-local supplements and the other two consisting of some non-local supplements.

Tale of the Pipa
Tale of the Pipa (or Tale of Lute) created by local Wenzhounese Gao Ming is a work of Nan opera that represents its highest quality and essence in its highest peak of influence in mid-Yuan Dynasty.

It is called the connecting bridge of the time of Nan opera and the time of chuanqi. The creation of Tale of the Pipa is among the greatest achievements of Chinese Opera and has had an enormous impact on composition of traditional Chinese opera, and therefore, it is usually called as the "Ancestor of all Plays" in China along with Nan drama being called as the "Ancestor of all Operas" in China. In the 19th century, Tale of the Pipa was translated into English, French, German and Latin. Ever since it was published in modern era, the Lute Song has been significant in the history of Western appreciation of Chinese literature.

The first translation of Lute Song was published in 1841 in Paris by Imprimerie Royale, written by Antoine (A. P. L.) Bazin titled Le Pi-pa-ki ou l'Histoire de Luth, making the history of the first chuanqi play published in a Western language In 1946, American musical comedy based on Tale of the Pipa, titled Lute Song written by Will Irwin, Sidney Howard and starred Yul Brenner and Mary Martin, was produced on Broadway.

Nancy Reagan
Tale of the Pipa is also the only Broadway appearance of then-future First Lady of the United States Nancy Reagan. In the play of Lute Song, Nancy Reagan "dyed her brown hair black and slanted her eyes like a real oriental girl", and the show's producer told her, "You look like you could be Chinese".

Like all the other Nan Opera plays written by local Wenzhounese artists majorly in the original language of Wenzhounese, the Lute Song is known for its complex linguistic demands which has caused international scholars to mainly focus on the shorter, and more accessible version as to their own concepts of the opera.

Four forms of Nan opera 
After the invention of Nan opera in Wenzhou in the 12th century, Nan Opera soon after started to spread its influence all across China as the first-ever mature form of Chinese opera. At the time in Ming Dynasty, the original form of Nan Opera sung in Wenzhounese lost its influence because of its universality and evolved into 4 different forms that were sung in four different tones(melodies). However, some scholars today argue that Nan Opera in Ming Dynasty were sung in five different tones (melodies).

The original Nan Opera gave births to four different forms of itself in Ming Dynasty: Haiyan Tone, Yuyao Tone, Kunshan Tone, and Yiyang Tone. Among the four forms, the most popular one today is known as the Kun Opera that evolved from the Kunshan Tone of Nan Opera in Ming Dynasty. Kun Opera is listed as one of the Masterpieces of the Oral and Intangible Heritage of Humanity by UNESCO since 2001.

Mathematics

Wenzhou has a long history of mathematics and many mathematical records in modern China are made by local Wenzhounese mathematicians and scholars. In 1896, the father of oracle bone script decipherment, Wenzhounese scholar Sun Yirang, founded the first-ever mathematics academy in the history of China, Ruian Mathematics Academy in Wenzhou. A year later, in 1897, local Wenzhounese Huang Qingcheng founded the first-ever periodical of mathematics in China, "Journal of Arithmetic". In 1899, a mathematical association was established in Wenzhou, named "Ruian Heaven Calculation Association", making the history of being the very first regional mathematical association in the history of China.

Cradle of Mathematicians

Wenzhou is renowned as the cradle of mathematicians in the Greater China Region; it has given births to over 200 mathematicians known both internationally and domestically in the past 100 years. According to numerous reports, in the 20th century, over one-fourth to one-third of chairs of mathematics department of colleges and mathematical associations all over China were local Wenzhounese mathematicians and scholars. During 2002 International Mathematical Union conference in Beijing, a case study named "analysis of vast communal formation of Wenzhounese mathematicians" was discussed by mathematicians from all over the world. The goal of analyzing the case study was to understand and acknowledge the significance of the cultural influence of Wenzhounese mathematicians and their contributions to mathematics. The case study was also brought up during the conference to analyze the future trend of cultivating a new generation of mathematicians in China and around the world. Such a rare phenomenon has never existed in the history of the world as throughout the history of the city, Wenzhou has given births to more mathematicians more than any other city in the world.

In an interview with local Wenzhounese mathematician, one of the pioneers of mathematics in modern China Su Buqing, conducted by Wenzhounese science fiction writer Ye Yonglie, many unknown details of the local Wenzhou mathematics culture were revealed. Ye Yonglie was told by Su Buqing that "many of the chairs of math departments of major universities in China were local Wenzhounese and in the conferences of International Mathematical Union, the local language of Wenzhounese is the unofficial and second language of the union besides official language English." Moreover, when Ye Yonglie asked Su Buqing whether "the commonly shared Wenzhounese cuisine culture of consuming Large yellow croaker was one of the major reasons of the vast formation of local mathematicians", Su Buqing answered "No, no, no. It's rather because of the fact that the entire area of Wenzhou is too poor to do science, and it only takes the cost of a pencil to do math, therefore, most of the Wenzhounese people just started to do math, and then, generations of local mathematicians just kept coming out of the city."

Jiang Lifu
Wenzhounese mathematician Jiang Lifu is commonly considered as the father of mathematics and pioneer of geometry in modern China. Jiang was the second person in modern China's history to obtain a PhD in mathematics and the first to do so in Wenzhou. In 1920, he returned to China and founded the Department of Mathematics at Nankai University, the second-ever mathematics department in the history of modern China. He was the only professor and teacher in the department for the first four years and was very strict with his teaching and students.

In 1940, Jiang became the chairman of the "Neo-China Mathematics Society." In 1947, Jiang founded the Institute of Mathematics of Academia Sinica and was the institute's founding director. He appointed his student, one of the most influential mathematicians of the 20th century, Shiing-Shen Chern to become the institute's acting director in Shanghai. Jiang also played a pioneering and fundamental role in encouraging and arranging foreign studies of mathematics for Chinese students in modern China in the early 20th century.

Mathematician Shiing-Shen Chern once noted that "for many years, Mr. Jiang was the foremost leader in the field of mathematics in China"(在许多年的时间里，姜先生是中国数学界最主要的领袖). Su Buqing also noted that "his influence and contribution to mathematics in modern China is so grand that without him, mathematics in China would have been completely different"(他对中国现代数学事业功劳重大，影响至深，没有他，中国数学面貌将会是另一个样子).

Shiing-Shen Chern
In October 2003, mathematician Shiing-Shen Chern visited Wenzhou as invited by Wenzhounese mathematician Gu Chaohao. During his visit, Chern wrote five words in Chinese calligraphy, "Home of Mathematicians," as he was marveled by the large number of prominent mathematicians and mathematical scholars from the city of Wenzhou. Throughout Chern's life, he developed many close and meaningful relationships with mathematicians from Wenzhou.

For instance, Chern's first mathematics teacher, mentor, and professor in life is Wenzhounese mathematician, Jiang Lifu. Jiang was the second person in modern China's history to obtain a PhD in mathematics and founded the Department of Mathematics at Nankai University, Chern's alma mater. Chern once noted that "I specialize in geometry because of my professor in college, Dr. Jiang"(我从事几何大都亏了我的大学老师姜立夫博士) and "my fundamental mathematical education was all given by Mr. Jiang through dictation"(我的基本数学训练都是姜先生口授的).

Taiwanese high-tech industry
Wenzhounese mathematician Shu Shien-Siu is today considered as the father of the high-tech industry in Taiwan while the high-tech industry today is considered to be the biggest contributor to Taiwan's economy. When Siu was the Minister of Science and Technology from 1973 to 1980, he proposed to establish the Hsinchu Science and Industrial Park in Hsinchu in 1976.

After Siu's revolutionary proposal, rounds of debate about the location of Hsinchu Science and Industrial Park unfolded. Chiang Ching-kuo argued that the park should be built in Longtan District in Taoyuan considering the potential benefits that could be drawn from National Chung-Shan Institute of Science and Technology and future relationship between the military field and the park. However, Shu Shien-Siu argued that the park should be built in Hsinchu because what Taiwan and the park needed was creativity and private economic power that would stem from the people instead of the government and the military. Therefore, Siu said that it was not a wise decision to draw too much relation between the military and the science and industrial park.  Also, Longtan District was a relatively remote place as compared to Hsinchu and thus, the potential of the park would be greatly diminished if it were to be built in Longtan District.

More importantly, Siu's decision made in 1976 is commonly praised today as he foresaw the right model of the park. Siu wanted the Hsinchu Science and Industrial Park to be like Silicon Valley which is adjacent to Stanford University and University of California, Berkeley. Thinking differently from Chiang Ching-kuo, Siu saw the potential advantages and tremendous resources the Hsinchu Science and Industrial Park could benefit from the National Tsing Hua University and National Chiao Tung University. Therefore, Siu determined to manage to build the park in Hsinchu, where both universities are located at.

Today, Hsinchu Science and Industrial Park is commonly considered as the Silicon Valley of the Orient and the high-tech industry stands as the biggest contributor to Taiwan's economy.

Higher education in Taiwan
In 1961, Shu Shien-Siu founded the Department of Mathematics at National Tsing Hua University, one of the most prestigious universities in Taiwan. A year later in 1962, Siu founded the Summer Mathematics Conference, the first-ever mathematical conference in the history of Taiwan.

When Siu became the president of National Tsing Hua University in 1970, there were only 3 academic departments and no college on campus and the university only held a population of over 660 people including faculty members. In order to expand the size of the university and contribute to the growth of Taiwan, Siu organized to establish the college of engineering that consists of five departments and expanded the Institute of Nuclear Engineering and Science by transforming it into the college of nuclear science which consists of two departments and one institute. From 1971 to 1973, Siu managed to employ a total of 165 professors with doctoral degrees. Also, during his presidency, Siu carried out the 15-year strategic plan for the university and placed heavy emphasis on the construction of buildings on campus such as the Department of Chemistry, the auditorium, the gymnasium and dormitories for students and housing buildings for academic staff as Siu sought to increase the bond between the academic staff and the students.

By the time he left National Tsing Hua University in 1975, the university had a total of nine departments, three colleges, and 13 institutes with a student population of over 2200(including graduate students) and academic staff population of over 160. In 1975, after Siu's five years of presidency, National Tsing Hua University placed first in all three fields of Mathematics, Physics, and Chemistry in Taiwan.

As Siu was deeply influenced by the Yongjia School of Thought when he grew up in Wenzhou, during his presidential career at the university, Siu placed heavy emphasis on the idea of practicality instead of the traditional Chinese belief of the importance of theory, and also made it clear that as students, the interaction with the society will always be more important than that within the campus. One of the most influential quotes of Siu is "What we need the most are the practitioners, who directly involve, but not the theorists". That main idea held by Siu to build the university in its early stage of development is almost identical as one of the central philosophies of Yongjia School of Thought, the cultural gene of the city of Wenzhou. Such a unique form of philosophy of Siu would later be proven to have a tremendous impact on the school and Taiwan's history as today, National Tsing Hua University is known for its emphasis on practicality in Taiwan.

"City of chess"
In 1995, Wenzhou was given the title of "City of Chess" by China Qiyuan, the official agency responsible for all board games and card games in mainland China. In 2020, Wenzhou celebrated its 25th anniversary of being the "City of Chess" in China. President of FIDE Arkady Dvorkovich sent a congratulatory letter to Wenzhou remarking that "Wenzhou has given births to many genius chess players, Ye Rongguang, Zhu Chen, Ding Liren, congratulate the 25th anniversary of Wenzhou being titled the "City of Chess" in China (温州出了很多天才型的棋手，叶荣光、诸宸、丁立人，祝贺温州被授予中国的国际象棋之城25周年).

Zhu Chen
Wenzhounese chess practitioner and grandmaster Zhu Chen is the first and currently, the only, chess player in the history of the world to win all youth, junior, and adult world championships. In August 1988, Zhu placed first and won the World Girls Under 12 Championship in Romania. In September 1994, Zhu placed first and won the World Girls Junior Chess Championship in Matinhos, Brazil. In November 1996, Zhu placed first and won the World Girls Junior Chess Championship in Medellin, Colombia. In December 2001, Zhu placed first and won the World Women's Individual Championship in Moscow, Russia.

In March 2002, during the FIDE Grand Prix in Dubai, Zhu defeated Ruslan Ponomariov, the World Chess Champion from 2002 to 2004, and knocked him out of the tournament, making her the first and only female world champion and athlete to defeat a male world champion in any competitive sport in the history of the world.

Zhu is the current treasurer of FIDE Management Board and FIDE Council as well as Vice President of FIDE Zonal Council.

Culture and demographics

Language

Wenzhou natives speak a language of Wu Chinese, the language family shared by Hangzhou, Ningbo, Suzhou and Shanghai; called Wenzhounese, also known as Oujiang or Dong'ou. Geographic isolation and the immigration of Southern Min speakers from nearby Fujian have caused Wenzhounese to evolve into a very phonologically divergent hybrid difficult for outsiders to understand. As a result, even the adjacent Taizhou Wu variety has little mutual intelligibility with Wenzhounese. Conversely Wenzhouness itself has spread to the Chinese immigrant communities in the Flushing and Brooklyn Chinatowns of New York City.

The esoteric Wenzhounese language is reputed to have been used during the Second Sino-Japanese War during wartime communication and in the Sino-Vietnamese War for programming military ciphers (code). Due to its unique grammar, vocabulary, and pronunciation, the language is basically impossible for any non-local to understand.

There is a common "fearing" rhymed saying in China that reflects the extreme comprehension difficulty of Wenzhounese: "Fear not the Heavens, fear not the Earth, but fear the Wenzhou person speaking Wenzhounese."

Religion

Most of the Wenzhou people practice Chinese folk religion as people in the rest of China, while a part of the population is non-religious. In addition, Buddhism, Taoism and Christianity also have a presence in the city.

Prior to 1949 there were 2,000 registered places of worship and 4,500 priests, pastors and monks in the city. But, the state officially designated Wenzhou as an experimental site for an "atheistic zone" in 1958 and during the Cultural Revolution (1966–1976), religious buildings were either closed or converted for other uses. Religion revived quickly since the 1980s, and today there are more registered places of worship than before. Specifically,  the city has 8,569 registered folk religious temples and 3,961 registered places of worship of the five institutional religions (Buddhism, Taoism, Islam, Catholicism and Protestantism). The city was the forefront in the registration and management of folk religious temples which was started in January 2015 and later extended to all Zhejiang.

"China's Jerusalem"
The city has been for centuries a hub of Christian missionary activity; prior to 1949 it was home to 115,000 Christians, more than one-tenth of the total Christians in China at that time. Today it remains an important center of Christianity in China. In 2006, it was reported that between 15 and 20% of the city's population was Christian. In 2012, according to official data the city's Christians were at least one million (about 11% of the 2010 population). Because of its large concentration of Christians, the city has been dubbed the "Jerusalem of the East" or "China's Jerusalem" in some media reports.

In recent years, the prominence of Wenzhou's Christian community has made it the target of some controversial government action. In 2014 CNN reported that local Communist Party authorities had demolished scores of churches and forcibly removed more than 300 church crosses. More recent reports have updated the numbers to over 200 churches destroyed and 2,000 crosses removed. The Chinese government denies that the demolition of churches constitutes persecution of Christians, pointing instead to violations of land-use regulations as the reason for its actions. However, independent human rights groups and news agencies have met this denial with skepticism. The New York Times, for example, reported that internal government documents the newspaper had obtained revealed that these demolitions represented part of a deliberate strategy to reduce the public profile of Christianity in the region. Specifically, the Times cites a nine-page statement of provincial policy, singling-out the Christian community as targets for the regulation of "excessive religious sites" and "overly popular" religious activities. "The priority," the document states, "is to remove crosses at religious activity sites on both sides of expressways, national highways and provincial highways," as well as to, "Over time and in batches, bring down the crosses from the rooftops to the facade of the buildings." The provincial policy has met with some resistance. A Christian pastor who protested the removal of the crosses and the beating of 50 Christians was also jailed in 2015.

Tourism

An essay written by Zhu Ziqing on the beauty of Meiyu Pond and waterfall in the Middle Yandang Mountains in Xianyan Subdistrict, Ouhai District, Wenzhou after his visits to the area in 1923 is among the sixty potential reading selections test takers may be asked to read for the Putonghua Proficiency Test.

With a history of over 120 million years, Yandang Mountains or Yandangshan Mountains, literally the wild goose pond mountain(s) is known for its natural environment, arising from its many vertical rock faces and pinnacles, mountain slopes with forests and bamboo groves, streams, waterfalls and caves.

Nanxi River located in Yongjia County, Nanxi River was famous for its 36 bends and 72 beaches. The main scenic spots of the Nanxi River area include the Furong Triangle Rock, the Waterfall of Tengxi Pool, the Twelve Peaks, the Taogong Cave, the Warehouse Under The Cliff, the Furong Ancient Hamlet and the Lion Rock. It was named as one of the National Tourist Scenic Spots by the State Council and has been listed in Tentative Lists of UNESCO World Heritage.

Covered bridges, Taishun County has more than 900 covered bridges, Wuyanling National Nature Reserve in the west of the county represents significant natural values as well as being a touristic attraction.

Due to the variety and diverseness of local tourism attractions, Wenzhou was voted as the venue for the 2016 Annual Convention of Society for American Travel Writers (SATW) in October 2016, after beating contenders including Israel, the State of Texas, and Royal Caribbean International, the world leading cruise operator.

Art and literature
Wenzhou is 1682 years old with a profound and brilliant cultural background. It has given birth to many outstanding people and great scholars. Among them were Wang Shipeng, Chen Fuliang, Ye Shi, Huang Gongwang and Liu Ji during the South Song Dynasty, as well as Sun Yirang, Xia Nai, Xia Chengtao and Su Buqing and others of the modern era. All of them have exerted significant influence in the history of Chinese philosophy, literature and science. Wenzhou is also the origin of China's landscape poetry, the founder of which, Xie Lingyun, was the chief of Wenzhou's Yongjia Prefecture in the Nan Dynasty. In Song Dynasty, there were 4 distinguished poets from Yongjia representing the River and Lake Poetry. Moreover, Wenzhou is the birthplace of Nan Drama of China, which is the origin of Chinese traditional drama of which includes drama forms such as Peking Opera and Yue Opera. "The Romance of a Hairpin", a tale about Wang Shipeng and Qian Yulian, is well known among locals and serves an inspiration for many who have endured life pains but still have faith in love.  For instance, "Tale of Lute", a play by Gao Zecheng of Ming Dynasty, is renowned abroad as one of the most outstanding works of Chinese drama along with Kun Opera of Yongjia which is recognized as the verbal and non-material human heritage. Dancing in public is also part of the Wenzhou culture.  Wenzhou, the birthplace of China's private economy, likewise is the birthplace of China's export-oriented industrialization. From the Southern Song Dynasty, in contrasted to the Confucianism represented by Zhu Xi and Lu Jiuyuan in China urging people to study to be officials in the future, the theory of Wenzhou's Yongjia School represented by Ye Shi, emphasized the importance of business. The theory has an enduring impact on the mindset of Wenzhou natives and has become the "cultural gene" in the economic development of Wenzhou ever since.

Business culture
Due to both Wenzhou's cultural and geographical remoteness and its lack of natural resources (land, minerals, etc.), the Chinese central government has left the people of Wenzhou relatively autonomous. Away from the center of the political and economic stage, its people are more independent, self-reliant, and generally more business and family oriented. Numerous books have been published about the business sense of people from Wenzhou. Hence, when China switched from its planned economy to its so-called capitalist economy with Chinese (socialist) characteristics in the late 1980s, its people adjusted well to the new system and took advantage of it. A popular common saying calls Wenzhounese the "Jews of the Orient". Wenzhounese have been stereotyped by other Chinese as real estate speculators. China Daily notes that investments from Wenzhounese buyers play a disproportionately large role in the increased property prices all over China.

The people of Wenzhou are thought to be equipped with business sense and a commercial culture more dominant than anywhere else in China. Wenzhou has two economic characteristics: it was the first to launch a market economy, and it continues to have an active and developed private economy.

Education
Wenzhou has one of the largest education sector, constituting 1/6 of the total in Zhejiang Province. As of the end of 2016, Wenzhou has 2368 schools of various kinds (from pre-school to higher education), with number of students stands at 1.4814 million and faculty number of 127,200.

Higher education
With most of its universities and colleges established after 1949, before 1949, there was not one single university or college in Wenzhou. The highest educational institution in Wenzhou at the time was senior high school.

There are three major universities in Wenzhou: Wenzhou University, Wenzhou Medical University and WenZhou-Kean University.
Wenzhou University resulted from the merger of the former University of Wenzhou, Wenzhou Normal College and other various normal colleges in the rural towns of Wenzhou. Its main campus is situated in the University Town, Cha Shan. The former campus of Wenzhou Normal College on Xueyuan Road is still in use, while the former main campus of the University of Wenzhou now serves as the campus of the Wenzhou Foreign Language School and the Second Experimental Middle School of Wenzhou (No.13 Middle School).

Wenzhou Medical University is well-known globally in specializing in ophthalmology (national level key discipline), as well as provision of other medical courses. Several of Wenzhou's major hospitals are affiliated to this university, with Wenzhou No.1 Affiliated Hospital of Wenzhou Medical University being the largest in floor space in Asia. The combined population of medical service covered by all the affiliated hospitals of Wenzhou Medical University is said to be over 20 million.

The Ministry of Education of the People's Republic of China approved the establishment of Wenzhou-Kean University on 16 November 2011. It is one of the first two Chinese-American cooperatively run universities with legal person status, the other one being NYU Shanghai inaugurated on 15 October 2012.

Official websites of universities and colleges in Wenzhou
Wenzhou University
Wenzhou Medical University
Wenzhou Business College
Wenzhou Kean University
Wenzhou Vocational & Technical College
Zhejiang DongFang Vocationa & Technical College
Zhejiang Industry and Trade Polytechnic
Wenzhou Institute, University of Chinese Academy of Sciences

Notable people

Mathematicians
Sun Yirang (1848–1908), pioneer of oracle bone script decipherment, founder of the first mathematical academy in the history of China, mentor of Huang Qingcheng
Huang Qingcheng (1863–1904), founder of the first periodical of mathematics in the history of China, student of Sun Yirang, uncle of Jiang Lifu
Jiang Lifu (1890–1978), father of mathematics in modern China, first director of Academia Sinica Institute of Mathematics, mentor of Shiing-Shen Chern, Su Buqing, father of Jiang Boju, nephew and student of Huang Qingcheng
Su Buqing (1902–2003), honorary chairman of Chinese Mathematical Society, first geometer in the Orient, renowned as "King of Math" in China, student of Jiang Lifu
Li Ruifu (1903–1987), prominent mathematician and astronomer, former vice chairman of Shanghai Mathematical Society and Shanghai Astronomical Society
Fang Dezhi (1910–), former chairman of the Department of Mathematics at Xiamen University
Shu Shien-Siu (1912–2002), father of high-tech industry in Taiwan
Xu Guifang (1912–), former chairman of the Department of Mathematics at Xi'an Jiaotong University, honorary director of Chinese Society of Computational Mathematics
Ky Fan (1914–2010), prominent mathematician, former director of Academia Sinica Institute of Mathematics, professor emeritus at University of California, Santa Barbara 
Xiang Fuchen (1916–1990), former chairman of the Department of Mathematics at National Taiwan University, former director of Academia Sinica Institute of Mathematics
Bai Zhengguo (1916–2015), one of the pioneers of geometry in China, student of Su Buqing, mentor of Gu Chaohao
Chung Tao Yang (1923–2005), chairman of the Department of Mathematics at University of Pennsylvania from 1978 to 1983, student of Su Buqing
Zhang Mingyong (1926–1986), former vice-chairman of Department of Mathematics at Xiamen University, mentor of Chen Jingrun, student of Su Buqing
Gu Chaohao (1926–2012), former president of University of Science and Technology of China, student of Su Buqing
Wu-Chung Hsiang (born 1935), chairman of the Department of Mathematics at Princeton University from 1982 to 1985, one of the most influential topologists of the second half of the 20th century
Hu Yuda (born 1935), former vice-chairman of executive council of Shanghai Mathematical Society, former executive director of Operations Research Society of China
Wu-Yi Hsiang (born 1937), prominent mathematician in geometry, professor emeritus at University of California, Berkeley, one of the provers of Kepler Conjecture
Jiang Boju (born 1937), first dean of School of Mathematical Sciences at Peking University, former chairman of Beijing Mathematical Society, son of Jiang Lifu
Chen Li-an (born 1937), former president of the Control Yuan and minister of National Defense and Economic Affairs of the Republic of China, son of Chen Cheng
Lee Peng Yee (born 1938), former president of Southeast Asian Mathematical Society, former vice president of International Commission on Mathematical Instruction
Lu Shanzhen (born 1939), prominent mathematician, former president of Beijing Normal University
Li Banghe (born 1942), prominent mathematician in differential topology, low-dimension topology and invariable quantum, solver of Minimal Genus Problem
Chen Dayue (born 1963), dean of School of Mathematical Sciences at Peking University, former vice president of Chinese Mathematical Society
T. Tony Cai (born 1967), 2008 COPSS Presidents' Award winner, former president of International Chinese Statistical Association

Go and chess players
Bao Yizhong (1500–1566), Go chess player, most prominent chess player of China in Ming Dynasty, renowned as the "highest echelon of Ming Dynasty"
Xie Xiaxun (1888–1987), father of Chinese chess, renowned as the "Supreme Commander of Chess" and "King of Chess"  in China
Ye Rongguang (born 1963), first-ever chess grandmaster in the history of China, coach of Zhu Chen
Zhu Chen (born 1976), first person to win all youth, junior, adult World Championships, female chess international grandmaster and Women's World Champion
Ding Liren (born 1992), chess grandmaster, youngest-ever winner of Chinese Chess Championship at age 16, ranked first nationally and third internationally , highest-ever Elo rated Chinese chess grandmaster

University presidents
Huang Shaoqi (1854–1908), first president and co-founder of Peking University (then Imperial University of Peking)
Jiang Qi (1885–1951), president of Jinan University from 1925 to 1927
Su Buqing (1902–2003), president of Fudan University from 1978 to 1983
Shu Shien-Siu (1912–2002), president of National Tsing Hua University from 1970 to 1975
Yu Chenye (1920–2015), president of Nanjing University of Aeronautics and Astronautics from 1982 to 1987
Chen Jinqing (1921–1991), president of Beijing Dance Academy from 1978 to 1984
Gu Chaohao (1926–2012), president of University of Science and Technology of China from 1988 to 1993
Chen Guangzhong (1930), president of China University of Political Science and Law from 1992 to 1994
Lu Shanzhen (born 1939), president of Beijing Normal University from 1995 to 1999
Frank Shu (1943), president of National Tsing Hua University from 2002 to 2006
Wu Qidi (born 1947), president of Tongji University from 1995 to 2003
Wu Boda (1950), president of Jilin University from 2002 to 2004
Zheng Xiaojing (1958), president of Xidian University
Teng Jinguang (1964), president of Hong Kong Polytechnic University
Xue Yanzhuang (1966), president of Zhejiang University from 1983 to 1986
Wu Zhaohui (1966), president of Zhejiang University

Academics
Wang Xizhi (303–361), sage of Chinese calligraphy, former governor of Yongjia (Wenzhou)
Ye Shi (1150–1223), philosopher, most important figure of the neo-Confucianism Yongjia School
Gao Juefu (1896–1993), psychologist
Wu Xianwen (1900–1985), one of the pioneers of Ichthyology and Nematology in China
Fang Jiekan (1901–1987), prominent calligrapher, former honorary chairman of Chinese Calligraphers Association
Cheng Man-ch'ing (1902–1975), t'ai chi ch'uan master, calligrapher, painter, poet, doctor of Chinese medicine, called the "Master of Five Excellences"
Xia Nai (1910–1985), archaeologist, pioneer of archaeology in modern China, one of the most honored scholars in archaeology
Qi Jun (1917–2006), author, best-selling female author of Taiwan, one of the most significant female authors in the history of China
Chen Cheng-siang (1922–2003), first prominent geographer in the history of China, one of the most prominent geographers in the world, renowned as the Alexander von Humboldt of the Orient
Chen Guangzhong (1930), jurist, renowned as the father of Criminal procedure of China
Frank Shu (1943), chair of astronomy department of University of California, Berkeley from 1984 to 1988, former president of American Astronomical Society, president of National Tsing Hua University, son of Shu Shien-Siu
Hsiao Cheng (1943), editor and member of executive council of Journal of Econometrics
Jin Henghui (1944), journalist, author, pundit, former vice president of Taiwan Society
Shen Zhixun (1962), experimental solid state physicist and a professor at Stanford University, one of the pioneers in materials physics, winner of E.O. Lawrence Award, Advisor for Science and Technology of SLAC National Accelerator Laboratory. 
Wu Zhaohui (1966), computer scientist, educator, president and professor of Zhejiang University

Politicians
Liu Ji (1311–1375), one of the greatest military strategists and statesmen in the history of China, founding father of Ming Dynasty alongside founding emperor Zhu Yuanzhang, renowned as the Divine Chinese Nostradamus, author of Shaobing Song
Huang Huai (1367–1449), Grand Secretariat of Ming Dynasty
Zhang Cong (1475–1539), Ming Dynasty prime minister, reformer, founder of Ming Dynasty Revolution
Dai Ren (1862–1937), revolutionist of Democracy in China, prominent politician during Republic of China, friend and partner of Sun Yat-sen 
Ruli Ing (1883–1940), former deputy minister of the Ministry of Finance of Republic of China, grandfather of Nita Ing 
Yao Weixin (1889–1977), former head instructor of Republic of China Military Academy and national policy advisor to the president of Republic of China
Lin Bin (1893–1958), former minister of the Ministry of Justice of Republic of China
Chen Cheng (1897–1965), former Vice President and Premier of the Republic of China
Ni Wenya (1902–2006), former president of the Legislative Yuan of Republic of China
Xiang Changquan (1903–2000), former vice president of Department of Civil Affairs of Republic of China, former mayor of Taipei, father of Wu-Chung Hsiang and Wu-Yi Hsiang
Hu Xin (1914–2002), former chief aide-de-camp to the president of Republic of China
Wu Qidi (born 1947), former vice prime minister of Ministry of Education of the People's Republic of China, former president of Tongji University, first collegiate president appointed through election in the history of China
Chen Lizhong (born 1921), former deputy director-general of National Police Agency and president of Taiwan Police College
Jean Ping (born 1942), former Chairperson of the Commission of the African Union, former President of the United Nations General Assembly, son of Wenzhounese businessman Cheng Zhiping
Wu Se-hwa (born 1955), former minister of Ministry of Education of Republic of China
Yin Yicui (born 1955), Chairwoman of Shanghai People's Congress from 2013 to 2020
Li Qiang (born 1959), Premier of the People's Republic of China, politician, CPC municipal committee secretary of Shanghai, member of the 19th Central Committee
Yi Huiman (born 1964), chairman of China Securities Regulatory Commission, former chairman of Industrial and Commercial Bank of China
Fang Xinghai (born 1964), vice-chairman of China Securities Regulatory Commission

Businesspeople
Sheun Mingling (born 1921), billionaire, founder of Evora SA, one of the world's biggest nonwoven manufacturer, biggest aluminum can manufacturer in Brazil 
Nina Wang (1937–2007), billionaire, businesswoman, former Asia and Hong Kong's richest woman, founder of Nina Tower, wife of Teddy Wang
Kung Yan-sum (born 1942), billionaire, brother of Nina Wang, chairman of Chinachem Group, one of the biggest property developers in Hong Kong
Jason Chang (born 1944), billionaire, founder and president of ASE Group, the world's largest provider of independent semiconductor manufacturing services 
Huang Jiannan (born 1945), former chief fundraiser for Democratic National Committee in 1996
Lin Jianhai (born 1955), economist, secretary-general of International Monetary Fund
Nita Ing (born 1955), business magnate, billionaire, first lady of the construction business in Taiwan, president of Continental Engineering Corporation
James Chu (born 1957), founder and president of Viewsonic, world's first-ever manufacturer of Smart Display 
Jen-Hsun Huang (born 1963), co-founder, president and CEO of Nvidia, founder of Jen-Hsun Huang Engineering Center of Stanford University
Wu Xiaohui (born 1966), owner of Waldorf Astoria New York, founder and CEO of China's second-biggest insurance group, Anbang Insurance Group

Athletes
Michelle Jin (born 1974), professional bodybuilder.
Xia Xuanze (born 1979), former male badminton player. Badminton at the 2000 Summer Olympics bronze medalist. BWF World Championships gold medalist. Current men's singles coach for the national team of China.
Ho-Pin Tung (born 1982), first Formula 1 racer in the history of China.
Zhu Qinan (born 1984), Games of the XXVIII Olympiad Gold Medalist in sport shooting
Xu Jiayu (born 1995), competitive swimmer who specializes in the backstroke, 2016 Summer Olympics silver medalist. FINA World Aquatics Championships gold medalist. 6X Asian Games gold medalist. Current national record holder in backstroke races in all distances (50, 100, and 200 meters). 
Yao Junsheng (born 1995), footballer who currently plays for Tianjin Tianhai and China national football team.
Zhang Yuning (footballer, born 1997) (born 1997), footballer who plays as a striker for Beijing Guoan in the Chinese Super League and for the China national football team.
Zheng Siwei (郑思维; born 1997), badminton player, three times World Champion, Asian Games gold medalist and Olympics silver medalist in the mixed doubles.

Others
Yongjia Xuanjue (655–713), Chán master, Tiantai Buddhist monk, author of the Song of Enlightenment
Miu Tianrui (1908–2009), pioneer of Musical temperament in China, "father of Music journalism" in China
Zeng Liansong (1917–1999), creator of Flag of the People's Republic of China
Nan Huai-Chin (1918–2012), spiritual teacher of contemporary China, the most important figure of Chinese Buddhism in modern China
Wang Zhaofan (born 1931), architect, one of the designers along with Minoru Yamasaki of original World Trade Center
Feng Zhenghu (born 1954), economist, activist, reputed as the "prominent human rights defender" in China
Zhou Yun (born 1978), main actress in Let the Bullets Fly and The Assassin
Tang Wei (born 1982), actress, main actress in Lust, Caution
Sui He (born 1989), Victoria's Secret fashion model, first Asian face of Shiseido, first Asian model to open a Ralph Lauren runway show
Winwin (Dong Si Cheng) (born 1997), known professionally as WINWIN (윈윈), is a lead dancer of K-pop group NCT (band) of SM Entertainment and WayV of Label V.
Estelle Chen (Chen Yu) (born 1998), Victoria's Secret fashion model, only Asian model in Dior Haute Couture 2015/2016
Cai Xukun (蔡徐坤; born 1998), known professionally as KUN, is a Chinese solo artist and former member of C-pop group Nine Percent
Justin (singer, born 2002) (Huang Ming Hao) (born 2002), former member of Nine Percent and current member of C-pop group NEXT (Chinese band) also known as NEX7 under Yuehua Entertainment
Wu Renhua, participant in and researcher on the 1989 Tiananmen Square protests
Chen Xuedong (陈学冬; born 1990), also known as Cheney Chen, Chinese actor
Zhou Lijie (周历杰; born 1997), Chinese actor

See also
List of twin towns and sister cities in China

References

Sources
Economic profile for Wenzhou at HKTDC
 Nanlai Cao, Constructing China's Jerusalem: Christians, Power and Place in the City of Wenzhou, Stanford, Stanford University Press, 2010, 232 pp.

External links

Government website of Wenzhou 
Government website of Wenzhou 
Wenzhou Municipal Office for Foreign & Overseas Chinese Affairs 
China, China's Boomtowns – National Geographic Magazine
US Army Service Map of Wenzhou from 1945
Manufacturing a China crisis – stratfor.com, reprinted by Business Spectator

 
Cities in Zhejiang
Jiangnan
Prefecture-level divisions of Zhejiang